Eilema flexistriata is a moth of the  subfamily Arctiinae. It is found in Madagascar.

References

flexistriata